Wessenden Reservoir is the second in a series of four reservoirs in the Wessenden Valley above the village of Marsden in West Yorkshire, at the northern end of the Peak District National Park.

Following the Wessenden Act of Parliament of 1836, the Wessenden Commissioners were established to build Wessenden Reservoir, to supply water to power the mills further down the valley and to protect people and property from floods. The reservoir was created by the construction of an earth embankment across Wessenden Brook. The reservoir ran dry during droughts in 1852, 1864 and 1865. The Huddersfield Waterworks Act of 1890 led to Huddersfield Corporation purchasing the reservoir from the Wessenden Commissioners in order to supply drinking water to the town.

The reservoir is currently owned and operated by Yorkshire Water.

The Wessenden Valley Woodland Project was initiated in 2017 to develop natural habitats with increased biodiversity.

The Pennine Way long-distance footpath runs along the northern side of the reservoir and its dam. The Peak District Boundary Walk long-distance trail also passes the northern end of the dam.

See also 

 Yorkshire Water Way

References 

Reservoirs of the Peak District
Reservoirs in Yorkshire